Aechmutes is a genus of beetles in the family Cerambycidae, containing the following species:

 Aechmutes armatus Gounelle, 1911
 Aechmutes boliviensis Clarke, 2012
 Aechmutes lycoides Bates, 1867
 Aechmutes subandinus Clarke, 2012

References

Rhinotragini